Superman – Ride of Steel are steel roller coasters located at two different Six Flags parks in the United States, including Six Flags America in Woodmore, Maryland, and Six Flags Darien Lake in Corfu, New York. At Six Flags Darien Lake, the coaster was renamed Ride of Steel in 2007, dropping Superman from the name. Both hypercoasters, manufactured by Intamin, are mirror-image and opened a year apart, beginning with the Darien Lake installation in May 1999 followed by Six Flags America in May 2000. A roller coaster with a similar name, Superman The Ride, opened at Six Flags New England in 2000 but features a significantly different layout.

VR experience
On March 3, 2016, Six Flags announced that the ride would be one of several rides at various Six Flags parks to feature a VR system. Riders have the option of wearing a Samsung Gear VR headset, powered by Oculus to create a  360-degree, 3D experience while riding. It is themed to Superman saving a city from Lex Luthor's Lex Bots who are causing chaos with an anti-gravity ray. This theming will also come to the Superman: Krypton Coaster at Six Flags Fiesta Texas and Superman The Ride at Six Flags New England.

Ride layout
Once the train has been dispatched from the station it makes a winding, 180-degree turn. The train ascends  up the lift hill and then drops  at an angle of 68 degrees. The train reaches the maximum speed of  before entering a sharp turn and the first airtime hill. A 540-degree helix follows, in addition to another smaller airtime hill. The finale involves a 500-degree helix and several more airtime hills before reaching the brake run and returning to the station.

Elements
 5 airtime hills (4 airtime hills and a twisted airtime hill)
 2 helixes (540 degree and 500 degree)

Accidents
 On May 16, 1999, a passenger was thrown from the train at the Darien Lake installment on one of the final hills and suffered minor injuries.
 On July 8, 2011, a handicapped Iraq War veteran on the Darien Lake installment riding in the front seat fell to his death. State investigators faulted operator error as the cause of the accident and the ride was re-opened on July 22, 2011. A common misconception about this accident is that an Iraq War veteran went to the park and was told he could ride all of the rides by a park employee. He actually went to the ride without asking anyone if he could ride. He was offered a safety brochure for handicapped patrons at the park entrance but refused it, claiming that he had already received one. The ride’s restraints are designed to hold passengers into the vehicle at both the hips and the shins. Signage at the ride entrance explicitly states that riders must have 2 functioning legs to ride in addition to meeting the height requirements. He was not height checked, because he entered the ride’s station via the exit, which also serves as the handicap entrance. Despite the fact that all three of the ride’s operators that day noticed that he did not have two functioning legs, none of the staff intervened to stop him from boarding. As a result, he was ejected from the ride after his hat flew off and he attempted to reach for it. He suffered blunt force trauma to the head and was killed instantly.

Rankings

References

External links
 Six Flags America's Official Page for Superman: Ride of Steel

Ride of Steel
Steel roller coasters
Roller coasters in Maryland
Roller coasters in New York (state)
Roller coasters manufactured by Intamin
Roller coasters operated by Six Flags
Six Flags America
Warner Bros. Global Brands and Experiences attractions